UFC 6: Clash of the Titans was the sixth mixed martial arts event held by the Ultimate Fighting Championship on July 14, 1995, at the Casper Events Center in Casper, Wyoming. The event was seen live on pay per view in the United States, and later released on home video.

History
UFC 6 featured the crowning of the first UFC Champion to win the title in a non-tournament format. The champion would be the winner of UFC 6. Also there was second special attraction match, called 'The Superfight' (later promoted heavyweight champion), which continued from UFC 5 as there was no official winner in the previous Superfight. UFC 6 also featured an eight-man tournament, and two alternate fights which were not shown on the live pay-per-view broadcast. The tournament had no weight classes, or weight limits. Each match had no rounds; therefore no judges were used for the night. A 20-minute time limit was imposed for the quarterfinal and semi-final round matches in the tournament. The finals of the tournament and the Superfight had a 30-minute time limit and, if necessary, a five-minute overtime.

This event continued the Superfight format from UFC 5 to determine the reigning UFC champion for tournament winners to face. Ken Shamrock remained in the spot and his opponent was UFC 5 champion Dan Severn in a championship match dubbed as "The Clash of the Titans".

The referee for the night was 'Big' John McCarthy, and Michael Buffer served as the guest ring announcer for the night. Ron Van Clief served as the UFC's first and only commissioner at the event. Taimak officiated the preliminary bouts at UFC 6 as well as UFC 7.

Results

UFC 6 Bracket

1Patrick Smith was forced to withdraw due to injury. He was replaced by Anthony Macias.

See also 
 Ultimate Fighting Championship
 List of UFC champions
 List of UFC events
 1995 in UFC

References

External links
UFC 6 results at Sherdog.com
UFC 6 fights reviews
Official UFC website
 MMA Mental History UFC 6

Ultimate Fighting Championship events
1995 in mixed martial arts
Mixed martial arts in Wyoming
Sports in Casper, Wyoming
1995 in sports in Wyoming
Sports competitions in Wyoming